Maryland's Legislative District 13 is one of 47 districts in the state for the Maryland General Assembly. It covers part of Howard County.

Demographic characteristics
As of the 2020 United States census, the district had a population of 146,321, of whom 109,653 (74.9%) were of voting age. The racial makeup of the district was 59,988 (41.0%) White, 37,765 (25.8%) African American, 663 (0.5%) Native American, 26,004 (17.8%) Asian, 58 (0.0%) Pacific Islander, 8,564 (5.9%) from some other race, and 13,265 (9.1%) from two or more races. Hispanic or Latino of any race were 16,422 (11.2%) of the population.

The district had 94,769 registered voters as of October 17, 2020, of whom 21,901 (23.1%) were registered as unaffiliated, 17,775 (18.8%) were registered as Republicans, 53,677 (56.6%) were registered as Democrats, and 864 (0.9%) were registered to other parties.

Political representation
The district is represented for the 2023–2027 legislative term in the State Senate by Guy J. Guzzone (D) and in the House of Delegates by Vanessa E. Atterbeary (D), Pam Guzzone (D) and Jennifer R. Terrasa (D).

References

Howard County, Maryland
13
13